The Oregon State League was a minor league baseball league that played briefly in the 1904 season. The Class D level Oregon State League featured four teams based in Oregon and Washington. The league permanently folded midway through its first season of play, with the Salem Raglans in 1st place.

History
The minor league Oregon State League was preceded by semi–pro leagues of the same name.

The Oregon State League was formed for the 1904 season as a Class D level minor league. The Oregon State League began play as a four–team league, hosting franchises from Eugene, Oregon (Eugene Blues),  Roseburg, Oregon (Roseburg Shamrocks), Salem, Oregon (Salem Raglans)  and Vancouver, Washington (Vancouver Soldiers).. (Some sources erroneously have the Vancouver Soldiers being from Vancouver, Canada).

On May 18, 1904, the Vancouver Soldiers, with a 3–8 record, moved from Vancouver, Washington to Albany, Oregon to become the Albany Rollers. The Oregon State League was not admitted to the National Association until it vacated the Vancouver, Washington franchise, which was deemed to be in the territory of the Portland Browns franchise of the Pacific Coast League.

The Oregon State League stopped play on Wednesday, July 6, 1904, when the Eugene and Roseburg franchises both folded.
The Oregon State League never returned to minor league play.

Oregon State League teams

1904 Oregon State League standings

Notable alumni
 Heinie Reitz, Eugene Blues
Hunky Shaw, Roseburg Shamrocks

References

Defunct minor baseball leagues in the United States
Baseball leagues in Oregon
Baseball leagues in Washington (state)
Defunct professional sports leagues in the United States
Sports leagues established in 1904
Sports leagues disestablished in 1904